The Journal of Eastern African Studies is a quarterly peer-reviewed academic journal covering research on the Eastern African region. It was established in 2007 and is published by Routledge on behalf of the British Institute in Eastern Africa.

Abstracting and indexing
The journal is abstracted and indexed in African Studies Abstracts Online, CAB Abstracts, Current Contents/Social & Behavioral Sciences, and the Social Sciences Citation Index. According to the Journal Citation Reports, the journal has a 2014 impact factor of 0.487.

References

External links 

British Institute in Eastern Africa

Publications established in 2007
English-language journals
Quarterly journals
Routledge academic journals
African studies journals